Allium lusitanicum is a plant species widespread over much of Europe, mostly in mountainous regions. It has been reported from every country on the continent from Portugal to Ukraine except Iceland, Ireland, the United Kingdom, Netherlands, Belgium, Luxembourg, Denmark, Finland, Albania and Greece.

Allium lusitanicumm is a bulb-forming perennial with thread-like leaves shorter than the stipes. Stipes are up to 20 cm tall. Tepals, anthers and styles are all a uniform shade of rose-violet.

References

lusitanicum
Onions
Flora of Europe
Plants described in 1783